Narcis Claudiu Răducan (born 23 September 1974 in Focşani) is a retired Romanian footballer who played as a midfielder.

Honours

Club
FCM Bacău
Liga II: 1994–95
Steaua București
Liga I: 1995–96, 1996–97, 1997–98
Cupa României: 1995–96, 1996–97
Rapid București
Cupa României: 2001–02
Supercupa României: 1999

External links
 
 

1974 births
Living people
Romanian footballers
Romania international footballers
FC Steaua București players
FCM Bacău players
FC Rapid București players
FC Progresul București players
AEK Larnaca FC players
AEL Limassol players
CSM Ceahlăul Piatra Neamț players
Liga I players
Cypriot First Division players
Romanian expatriate footballers
Romanian expatriate sportspeople in Cyprus
Expatriate footballers in Cyprus
Association football midfielders
Sportspeople from Focșani